Bonny Doon is a census-designated place in Santa Cruz County, California.  It is situated northwest of the city of Santa Cruz, considered part of the southern San Francisco Bay Area or northern Monterey Bay Area. Bonny Doon's population was 2,868, as reported by the 2020 United States Census.

History
It was founded in the 1850s as a logging camp.  The current name can be attested back to 1902:  John Burns, a Scotsman living in Santa Cruz, named Bonny Doon after a line in the Robert Burns song "The Banks O' Doon". The line is: "Ye banks and braes o' bonnie Doon...", and refers back to the Doon River in Scotland.   Evidence of 2,600 years of occupation by Native Americans has been found in the area.

Bonny Doon has no city center or commercial shops, but features several wineries including Bonny Doon Vineyard, a church, two fire stations, a lavender farm, the Bonny Doon Ecological Reserve, an elementary school, and a private-use airport.  A beach of the same name is nearby.

In 2020, Bonny Doon was popular with remote workers during the COVID-19 pandemic.

Wildfires
At 2:54 p.m. on June 11, 2008, a fire broke out at the Bonny Doon Ecological Reserve, a preserve with a number of hiking trails located on Martin Road. This Martin Fire burned , destroying three residences and eight outbuildings. About 1,500 residents of Bonny Doon were evacuated as a result of the fire. Governor Arnold Schwarzenegger declared a state of emergency for Santa Cruz County. The blaze cost over $5.4 million to contain and was part of a busy summer of wildfires in California.

Little more than one year later, on August 12, 2009 at 7:16 pm, a second fire started in Bonny Doon, near the Lockheed facility off Empire Grade. The Lockheed Fire burned , and destroyed 13 outbuildings.  More than 2,000 residents were evacuated as the blaze spread from Swanton south toward Bonny Doon. The blaze cost over $26.6 million and took nearly 2 weeks to be fully contained. The cause of the fire remains under investigation.

In August 2020, Bonny Doon was affected by the CZU complex of lightning-initiated fires, which joined together to form one of the top 10 largest fires ever in California.  Many home structures, the local school, and lavender field farm were protected by local residents – and one neighbor’s (borrowed) fire equipment truck.  This band of neighbors defied an evacuation order and worked together over 4 days and nights to save multiple properties in their community, with the help of CAL Fire at the very peak of the fire.  {Stories of the heroic actions of community members who stayed behind to protect homes yet to be added by a local resident}

Geography

According to the United States Census Bureau, the CDP covers an area of 16.7 square miles (43.2 km), all of it land.

The area is on a slope with higher elevations in redwood forest or maritime chaparral, and lower elevations descending into the coastal zone, which is occupied by grasslands.  There are ocean views from parts of the area on days when fog is not present. 

The Davenport plant had supplied cement for later stages of the Panama Canal and other large projects since its founding in 1906, but is now closed.

Demographics 

At the 2010 census Bonny Doon had a population of 2,678. The census reported that 99.0% of the population lived in households and 1.0% lived in non-institutionalized group quarters. The average household size was 2.44.

The homeowner vacancy rate was 1.2%; the rental vacancy rate was 4.9%. 75.7% of the population lived in owner-occupied housing units and 23.3% lived in rental housing units.

There were 1,088 households, 268 (24.6%) had children under the age of 18 living in them, 579 (53.2%) were opposite-sex married couples living together, 59 (5.4%) had a female householder with no husband present, 49 (4.5%) had a male householder with no wife present.  There were 76 (7.0%) unmarried opposite-sex partnerships, and 17 (1.6%) same-sex married couples or partnerships.  264 households (24.3%) were one person and 79 (7.3%) had someone living alone who was 65 or older.   There were 687 families (63.1% of households); the average family size was 2.77.

The racial makeup of Bonny Doon was 2,474 (92.4%) White, 9 (0.3%) African American, 15 (0.6%) Native American, 51 (1.9%) Asian, 5 (0.2%) Pacific Islander, 48 (1.8%) from other races, and 76 (2.8%) from two or more races.  Hispanic or Latino of any race were 168 people (6.3%).

The age of the population was spread out, with 447 people (16.7%) under the age of 18, 210 people (7.8%) aged 18 to 24, 579 people (21.6%) aged 25 to 44, 1,082 people (40.4%) aged 45 to 64, and 360 people (13.4%) who were 65 or older.  The median age was 47.5 years.

There were more males than females. For every 100 females, there were 110.7 males.  For every 100 females age 18 and over, there were 112.9 males.

Government

Infrastructure
Internet and television service are available but mobile phone service is very limited due to the mountainous terrain and trees.

Notable people
Robert A. Heinlein (1907–1988), a noted science fiction author, and his wife Virginia, resided in Bonny Doon from 1965 until just before his death. They designed and built the house themselves.

Bonny Doon was briefly in the spotlight in 2009 when model Jasmine Fiore was murdered. Jasmine grew up in Bonny Doon and attended the local elementary, where she was known as Jasmine Lepore.

References

External links
 https://web.archive.org/web/20161214144825/http://www.bonny-doon.info/
 Rural Bonny Doon Association

Census-designated places in Santa Cruz County, California
Census-designated places in California
1850s establishments in California